Quế Võ is a town of Bắc Ninh province in the Red River Delta region of Vietnam. As of 2003, the town had a population of 154,694. The district covers an area of 171 km². The district capital lies at Phố Mới.

References

Districts of Bắc Ninh province